The Russian Kiln Site is a historic archaeological site on Long Island, part of the Kodiak Archipelago of southern Alaska.  It is one of the oldest industrial sites in Alaska, established by the Russian American Company for the production of bricks, an otherwise rare commodity in 19th-century Russian America.  The kilns on the site were reported to produce between 3000 and 6000 bricks annually.  Brick debris is scattered along the shore of Long Island in the area, which subsided after the 1964 Alaska earthquake and is subject to erosion.  It is one of several sites in the vicinity of Kodiak Island where the Russians produced bricks.

The site was listed on the National Register of Historic Places in 1978.

See also
National Register of Historic Places listings in Kodiak Island Borough, Alaska

References

Archaeological sites on the National Register of Historic Places in Alaska
Kodiak Island Borough, Alaska
National Register of Historic Places in Kodiak Island Borough, Alaska